Utah State Route 177 may refer to:

 Utah State Route 177 (1965-1987), West 9000 South, a former state highway in West Jordan and Sandy in southern Salt Lake Valley in southwestern Salt Lake County, Utah, United States, that connected Utah State Route 68 (Redwood Road) in West Jordan with U.S. Route 89 (South State Street) in Sandy
 Utah State Route 177 (1935-1963), a former state highway in Provo, Utah, United States, that formed a southern loop off of Utah State Route 1 (U.S. Route 89/U.S. Route 91), running from West Center Street and 500 West to South University Avenue and 300 South
 West Davis Corridor, a future freeway in Davis County that will be designated State Route 177

See also

 List of state highways in Utah
 List of highways numbered 177

External links

 Utah Department of Transportation Highway Resolutions: Route 177 (PDF)